Columbus Township may refer to:

 Columbus Township, Adams County, Illinois
 Columbus Township, Bartholomew County, Indiana
 Columbus Township, Luce County, Michigan
 Columbus Township, St. Clair County, Michigan
 Columbus Township, Anoka County, Minnesota, now the city of Columbus
 Columbus Township, Johnson County, Missouri
 Columbus Township, Platte County, Nebraska
 Columbus Township, Warren County, Pennsylvania

Township name disambiguation pages